Takao Station (高尾駅) is the name of two railway stations in Japan:

 Takao Station (Gifu)
 Takao Station (Tokyo)